KDAR (98.3 MHz, "The Word") is a commercial FM radio station licensed to Oxnard, California, and serving the Oxnard-Ventura and Santa Barbara radio markets. It is owned by the Salem Media Group and it broadcasts a Christian talk and teaching radio format.  It uses brokered programming where hosts buy their time on the air and may seek donations to their ministries during their programs.  National religious leaders heard on KDAR include John MacArthur, Jim Daly, Alistair Begg, Chuck Swindoll, Charles Stanley and David Jeremiah.  Updates are provided by SRN News.

KDAR has an effective radiated power (ERP) of 1,500 watts.  The transmitter is on Red Mountain Fire Road in Ventura.  Programming is also heard on 3,700-watt FM booster station KDAR-1 (98.3) in Santa Barbara, located atop Gibraltar Peak just outside the city.

History
Religious broadcaster Edward G. Atsinger III, was the station's original owner, president, and general manager. In 1986, Atsinger transferred control of the station's license to Salem Communications Corporation, an entity of which he owned half at the time.

In its early years, KDAR aired several hours of Contemporary Christian music each day in addition to Christian talk shows. Since the early 1990s, however, the station has reduced its music programming.  It now runs talk and teaching programs around the clock.

References

External links

DAR
Radio stations established in 1974
Salem Media Group properties